Nicholas Igel is a retired American soccer player who played professionally in the National Professional Soccer League and Eastern Indoor Soccer League.

Igel attended the University of Dayton, playing on the men’s soccer team from 1990 to 1993.  He scored twenty-five goals and added seventeen assists in his seventy games there.

From 1994 to 1996, he played for the Columbus Xoggz of the USISL.  He was a Midwest Division All Star in 1995.  In the fall of 1996, Igel joined the Columbus Invaders of the National Indoor Professional Soccer League for one season.  In 1997, he moved to the Milwaukee Rampage of the USISL A-League, winning the 1997 league title in penalty kicks.  In the championship game, Igel was one of three Rampage players who made their kicks to seal the title for Milwaukee.  Igel played three seasons for the Rampage in addition to one season for the Milwaukee Wave (1998-1999) of the NPSL.   From 2000 to at least 2003, he played for the amateur Milwaukee Bavarians.

References

Living people
1972 births
American soccer players
Columbus Invaders players
Ohio Xoggz players
Dayton Flyers men's soccer players
Milwaukee Rampage players
Milwaukee Wave players
National Professional Soccer League (1984–2001) players
A-League (1995–2004) players
Association football forwards
Association football midfielders